Patrick "Pat" William Murphy (born 6 June 1962) is a Canadian politician, who represented the electoral district of Alberton-Roseville in the Legislative Assembly of Prince Edward Island from 2007 to 2019.

A member of the Liberal Party, he was first elected in the 2007 Prince Edward Island general election. On February 15, 2017, Murphy was appointed to the Executive Council of Prince Edward Island as Minister of Rural and Regional Development.

In the 2019 Prince Edward Island general election, he was defeated by Ernie Hudson in the redistributed riding of Alberton-Bloomfield.

Murphy owns and operates the Irving service station in Alberton. He was mayor of Alberton from January 2004 to December 2006.

References

External links
 Pat Murphy

Living people
People from Alberton, Prince Edward Island
Prince Edward Island Liberal Party MLAs
Mayors of places in Prince Edward Island
21st-century Canadian politicians
Members of the Executive Council of Prince Edward Island
1962 births